Thrushelton or Thruselton is a village and civil parish about 2 and a half miles north of Coryton railway station, in the West Devon district, in the county of Devon, England. In 2011 the parish had a population of 197. The parish touches Bratton Clovelly, Bridestowe, Lewtrenchard, Stowford, Broadwoodwidger, Marystow and Germansweek.

Features 
There are 22 listed buildings in Thrushelton.

History 
Thrushelton was recorded in the Domesday Book as Tresetone. The name "Thrushelton" means 'Thrush farm/settlement'. The parish was historically in the Lifton hundred. On the 25th of March 1885 Wortham, Orchard, and Kilson Houses was transferred from Lewtrenchard parish to Thrushelton parish. The transferred area contained 3 houses in 1891.

References

External links 

Villages in the Borough of West Devon